Rhododendron coriaceum (革叶杜鹃) is a rhododendron species native to southeast Xizang and northwest Yunnan, China, where it grows at altitudes of . The flowers are predominantly white.

References

 "Rhododendron coriaceum", Franchet, J. Bot. (Morot). 12: 258. 1898.

coriaceum
Taxa named by Adrien René Franchet
Plants described in 1898